Nathan Trevett (born 23 March 1985) is a Welsh rugby union player. A prop, he plays club rugby for London Welsh after he signed from Welsh region Cardiff Blues for the 2013–14 season

References

External links
 Cardiff Blues profile

Welsh rugby union players
Cardiff Rugby players
London Welsh RFC players
1985 births
Living people
Rugby union props